The 1998 season is the 45th year in Guangzhou Football Club's existence, their 31st season in the Chinese football league and the 5th season in the professional football league. After selling two key players (Peng Weiguo and Hu Zhijun) at the beginning of the season, the club finished the last place of the league in this season and relegated to Jia-B League.

Squad

Transfers

Winter

 In

 Out

Match results

Jia-A League

FA Cup

References

Guangzhou F.C. seasons
Chinese football clubs 1998 season